Thames Bridge may refer to

Thames Bridge, the official name of the A34 Road Bridge at Oxford, England
M4 Thames Bridge, a bridge at Maidenhead, England
Thames River Bridge (Amtrak), a bridge in Connecticut
Thames Bridge (cryptography), a classified United Kingdom government cipher

See also 
Crossings of the River Thames